QMC may refer to:

 Quaid e Azam Medical College, a medical college in Bahawalpur, Pakistan
 Quantum Monte Carlo, a class of computer algorithms
 Quartermaster Corporal, a type of appointment in the British Household Cavalry
 Quasi-Monte Carlo method, an integration method in mathematics
 Queen Margaret College, now Queen Margaret University, in Edinburgh, Scotland
 Queen Margaret College (Wellington), an all-girls high school in Wellington, New Zealand
 Queen Mary Coast, a portion of the coast of Antarctica
 Queen Mary College, a former college of the University of London, now part of Queen Mary University of London
 Queen Mary's College, a Sixth Form College in Basingstoke, Hampshire, England
 Queen's Medical Centre, a hospital in Nottingham, England
 Quezon Memorial Circle, a national park and shrine in Quezon City, Philippines
 Quine–McCluskey algorithm, a method used for the minimization of Boolean functions